The Review of Economic Studies (also known as REStud) is a quarterly peer-reviewed academic journal covering economics. It was established in 1933 by a group of economists based in Britain and the United States. The original editorial team consisted of Abba P. Lerner, Paul Sweezy, and Ursula Kathleen Hicks. It is published by Oxford University Press. 
The journal is widely considered one of the top 5 journals in economics. It is managed by the editorial board currently chaired by Nicola Fuchs-Schündeln (Goethe University Frankfurt). The current joint managing editors are Thomas Chaney (Sciences Po), Andrea Galeotti (London Business School), Nicola Gennaioli (Bocconi University), Veronica Guerrieri (University of Chicago), Kurt Mitman (Institute for International Economic Studies, Stockholm University), Francesca Molinari (Cornell University), Uta Schönberg (University College London), and Adam Szeidl (Central European University). According to the Journal Citation Reports, the journal has a 2020 impact factor of 6.345.

History

The journal was founded in 1933. From the beginning, the board of editors has operated independently of any university department or learned society. The founding document of the journal stated that "The object of the Review is to supplement the facilities for the publication of new work on theoretical and applied economics, particularly by young writers." and that "Any member" of the editorial board "who becomes a Reader or Professor in a British University must resign his membership." 

In its early years, the journal was used to log the macroeconomic debates of younger followers of Friedrich Hayek (such as Abba Lerner) and John Maynard Keynes (such as the members of the  Cambridge Circus).

Notable papers 
Some of the most path-breaking and influential articles published in The Review of Economic Studies are:

References

External links 
 

Economics journals
Wiley-Blackwell academic journals
Publications established in 1933
English-language journals
Quarterly journals